Châtillon-sur-Lison is a commune in the Doubs department in the Bourgogne-Franche-Comté region in eastern France. On 1 January 2022 it was absorbed into the commune of Cussey-sur-Lison.

Population

See also
 Communes of the Doubs department

References

Former communes of Doubs